Ahmed Mohiuddin may refer to:

 Ahmed Mohiuddin (1923–1998), Pakistani scientist, scholar
 Ahmed Mohiuddin (politician) (1898–19xx), Indian politician

See also
 Mohiuddin Ahmed (died 2010), Bangladesh Army officer
 Mohiuddin Ahmad, Bangladeshi film director
Mohiuddin Ahmad, Bangladeshi author